The Nadari River is a river that runs through the Indian states of Andhra Pradesh and Tamil Nadu. The Nadari  river originates in the Velikonda mountains near Puttur and runs for about  through Nellore and Thiruvallur districts before joining the Buckingham Canal and joining the Bay of Bengal near Ennore.

References
 

Rivers of Tamil Nadu
Rivers of Andhra Pradesh
Geography of Nellore district
Rivers of India